= Magnetic Fantasies =

American gaming magazine

- Categories: Video games
- Frequency: Bimonthly
- Publisher: Claude Plum, Richard Koch, and Arnett Taylor
- First issue: Feb 1981
- Country: United States
- Based in: Los Angeles, California

Magnetic Fantasies was an American gaming magazine first published in February 1981, and published by Magnetic Fantasies, edited and published by Claude Plum, Richard Koch, and Arnett Taylor. The magazine was published bimonthly and headquartered in Los Angeles, California.

== Contents ==
Magnetic Fantasies was a publication devoted to covering computer fantasy role-playing games.

== Reception ==
Bruce F. Webster reviewed Magnetic Fantasies in The Space Gamer No. 43. Webster commented that "Recommendation: look before you buy, and buy only if there is some information in there worth the cost of the magazine. I realize they're just starting ... but I don't remember the early Space Gamers being this bad."
